Patrick James Lynch (born November 14, 1953 in Monterey, California) is an American author, artist, biomedical illustrator, and photographer. He lives in North Haven, Connecticut with his wife Susan E. Grajek. He has one daughter, Kathryn, and a son-in-law, Zubin.

He has written four editions of the Web Style Guide for Yale University Press with his co-author Sarah Horton. Web Style Guide has been published in eleven languages, and was named one of Amazon's top 10 web books in 1999. In a New York Times review, J. D. Biersdorfer describes the book as “an ‘Elements of Style’ for Webmasters.”

Lynch also writes and illustrates field guides with his friend and co-author Noble S. Proctor, a renowned American birder, naturalist, and emeritus professor at Southern Connecticut State University. Their Field Guide to North Atlantic Wildlife was published by Yale University Press in 2005. Lynch's latest field guide is A Field Guide to Long Island Sound with color illustrations, published in 2017.

References

External links

The complete text of the fourth edition of the Web Style Guide online

Southern Connecticut State University faculty
American technology writers
Living people
1953 births
Medical illustrators
People from Monterey, California
People from North Haven, Connecticut
American nature writers
American male non-fiction writers